Aden is an Arabic, Hebrew  male name, used most commonly in Somalia. It can also be a surname.

Given name
 Aden Adde (1908–2007), Somali politician and first president of the Somali Republic
 Aden Isaq Ahmed (born 1923, unknown death date), Somali politician 
 Aden Mohamed Ali (born 1939), Somali politician
 Aden Robleh Awaleh, (1941–2014), Djiboutian politician
 Aden Hashi Farah Ayro (died 2008), Somalian military commander
 Aden Baldwin (born 1997), English footballer
 Aden Chambers (born 1983), American wrestler
 Aden Charmakeh (born 1984), Djiboutian footballer
 Aden Abdullah Osman Daar (1908–2007), first president of Somalia
 Aden Duale (born 1969), Somali-Kenyan politician
 Aden Durde (born 1980), American football player and coach
 Aden Hashi Farah (died 2008), Somali military commander
 Aden Flint (born 1989), English football defender
 Aden Gillett (born 1958), British actor
 Aden Sh. Hassan, Djiboutian diplomat
 Aden Ibrahim Aw Hirsi (born 1978), Somali politician and author
 Aden Kirk (born 1992), English darts player
 Aden Madobe (born 1956), Somalian politician
 Aden Meinel (1922–2011), American astronomer
 Aden Abdullahi Nur (died 2002), Somali politician and military general
 Aden Ridgeway (born 1962), Australian politician
 Aden Farah Samatar (born 1943), Djiboutian songwriter, composer, poet, and singer
 Aden Saran-Sor, Somali warlord
 Aden Sugow, Kenyan politician
 Aden Tutton (born 1984), Australian volleyball player
 Aden Young (born 1972), Canadian-Australian actor

Fictional characters 

 Aden Jefferies, a character from the Australian soap opera Home and Away

Surname
 Amal Aden (born 1983), Somali-Norwegian writer
 Faisal Aden (born 1989), Somali basketball player 
 Holger Aden (born 1965), German football forward
 Ibrahim Mohamed Aden (born 1972), Somali-American middle-distance runner
 Omar Hashi Aden (died 2009), Somali politician
 Sharif Hassan Sheikh Aden (born c. 1946), Somali politician

Both
 Aden Ali Aden (born 1988), Qatari footballer

Hebrew masculine given names
Arabic masculine given names
Somali masculine given names
Surnames of Somali origin